Richard Harman Jeffares Reeves (1836 – 1 June 1910) was a New Zealand politician of the Liberal Party.  He was acting Speaker of the Legislative Council in 1905.

Biography

Early life and career
Reeves was born in Enniscorthy, County Wexford, Ireland, in 1836. He was educated at Barrow Grammar School, and subsequently at Tarvin, Cheshire. In early youth he went to sea and in 1852 he left England for Sydney, New South Wales. He worked in various trades, including mining, store keeping, cattle dealing and auctioneering.

Political career

Whilst absent on a visit to Australia in 1866, he was elected member for the Hokitika electorate in the Canterbury Provincial Council, but resigned on his return to New Zealand, as he found that pressure of business prevented him from taking his seat. His membership lasted from 4 July to 20 October 1866.  When the West Coast was separated from Canterbury, Reeves was elected onto the Westland County for the Hokitika riding (May 1869 – June 1870). He represented the Grey electorate on the Nelson Provincial Council in the last few months before the abolition of the provincial governments (28 April 1876 – 31 October 1876).

He represented the Grey Valley electorate in Parliament from an 1878 by-election, caused by the resignation of Martin Kennedy, to 1881. He was defeated for the Inangahua electorate in the 1881 general election, but won that electorate in 1887. He resigned on 26 April 1893 as he had been adjudged bankrupt. At the November , he contested the electorate once more, but came last of the three candidates.

Reeves was appointed to the Legislative Council on 13 December 1895, and was reappointed at the end of the term in 1902 and 1909. After the death of Alfred Cadman, he was acting Speaker in 1905 (23 March – 30 June). He was Chairman of Committees for three periods between 1904 and his death on 1 June 1910.

He died in Nelson aged 76 of a heart attack after an illness. His wife had died in November 1908. They are both buried at Wakapuaka Cemetery.

Reeves was an elder brother of Charles Stephen Reeves, who was Mayor of Dunedin in 1876.

See also
1893 Inangahua by-election

Notes

References
 This article incorporates text from a publication now in the public domain: 

Who’s Who in New Zealand (1st edition, 1908)
Dictionary of New Zealand Biography (1940)

|-

|-

|-

1836 births
1910 deaths
New Zealand Liberal Party MPs
Members of the Canterbury Provincial Council
New Zealand people of Irish descent
People educated at Barrow-in-Furness Grammar School for Boys
Politicians from County Wexford
Speakers of the New Zealand Legislative Council
Members of the New Zealand Legislative Council
Members of the Nelson Provincial Council
Members of the Westland County Council
Unsuccessful candidates in the 1881 New Zealand general election
Unsuccessful candidates in the 1884 New Zealand general election
Date of birth unknown
Unsuccessful candidates in the 1893 New Zealand general election
19th-century New Zealand politicians
Burials at Wakapuaka Cemetery